Christian Lüscher (born 6 December 1963) is a Swiss attorney and politician of FDP.The Liberals (Parti liberal suisse), representing the Canton of Geneva in the National Council.  He stood for election to the Swiss Federal Council on 16 September 2009.

Born in Geneva, Lüscher served in the municipal parliament of Troinex as a member of the Liberal Party from 1999 to 2003. From 2001 to 2007, he was a member of the cantonal parliament of Geneva. In 2007, he was elected to the National Council, where he serves on the Legal Committee, the Redaction Committee and the Judicial Committee.

Political positions
During the campaign for the 2009 Federal Council elections Lüscher declared to the newspaper "Tribune de Genève" to represent the right wing of the Swiss political spectrum.

Lüscher is a firm supporter of banking secrecy. He is in favor of the construction of new nuclear plants in Switzerland.

Professional career
Lüscher practises law in Geneva with Charles Poncet and others as a partner in the ZPG law firm. He was co-chairman of the Servette FC football club from 2002 until its bankruptcy in 2005.

Lüscher is divorced. He has five children, including twin daughters from a relationship with Marie Schiefelbusch, a financial fortune manager for the bank Julius Bär.

References

External links

1963 births
Living people
Lawyers from Geneva
Liberal Party of Switzerland politicians
FDP.The Liberals politicians
Members of the National Council (Switzerland)
Politicians from Geneva